The Public Eye is a Canadian public affairs television series which aired on CBC Television from 1965 to 1969.

Premise
This journalistic series covered various subjects of global and domestic scope.

Some 1966 episodes were co-produced with CBC's Newsmagazine series and identified as This Week. Its 1966 production budget was approximately $18,000 per episode.

A June 1966 episode featured the conflict between Canadian leaders Lester B. Pearson and John Diefenbaker, noting how their adversarial relationship concealed more fundamental national concerns.

After a popular series of "town meeting" segments in the 1967–68 season, a studio audience was introduced as a regular feature of the following, final season. Prime Minister Pierre Trudeau appeared in a later episode.

Scheduling
This half-hour series was broadcast as follows (times are in Eastern):

Bibliography

References

External links
 

CBC Television original programming
1965 Canadian television series debuts
1969 Canadian television series endings
1960s Canadian television news shows
Television news program articles using incorrect naming style